William Micah Williams (24 May 1851 – 11 August 1924) was an Australian politician, commonly referred to as W. M. Williams. He was born in New Norfolk, Tasmania. In 1916 he was elected to the Tasmanian Legislative Council as the Independent member for Hobart, serving until his defeat in 1922. Williams died in Hobart in 1924.

References

1851 births
1924 deaths
Independent members of the Parliament of Tasmania
Members of the Tasmanian Legislative Council